Seoán Ó Laidig, O.P., was Bishop of Killala Ireland. Appointed on 22 June 1253, he was consecrated on 7 December 1253. He abdicated on 21 February 1264, and died in 1275.

References

13th-century Roman Catholic bishops in Ireland
Bishops of Killala
1275 deaths
Year of birth missing